40th Street station  is an underground station on the SEPTA Market-Frankford Line, located the intersection of 40th Street and Market Street in Philadelphia, Pennsylvania, on the line between the Spruce Hill and Powelton Village neighborhoods in the University City District of West Philadelphia. The station serves a major shopping corridor of West Philadelphia on 40th Street, as well as the campus of the University of Pennsylvania, which lies three blocks south of the station.

The station is served by SEPTA City Bus routes 30, 40 and LUCY. The station also serves as the inbound terminal for the SEPTA subway-surface trolley lines when services are diverted from the Market Street tunnels –– on Mondays from 12:00 a.m. to 5:00 a.m. and during any other unforeseen circumstances. All five trolley routes terminate at the intersection 40th Street and Market Street, just outside entrances to the Market–Frankford platforms.

History

The PRT announced a project to bury the elevated tracks between 23rd to 46th streets in the 1920s. The tunnel from 23rd to 32nd streets was completed by 1933, but construction on the remaining segment was put on hiatus due to the Great Depression and World War II. The PRT went bankrupt in 1939 and was reorganized as the PTC, which began building the rest of the tunnel in 1947.

The station was renovated in 2017, bringing it to ADA accessibility requirements. Two elevators were installed, one for each platform, each of the four entrance stairwells were covered with artistic screens, and underground lighting and tiles were replaced. The project was completed on October 21, 2017, at a total cost of $10.9 million.

Station layout
The station has two side platforms with separate fare control on either side. West of the station, the tracks climb out of a portal near 44th Street and run west as an elevated line.

Image gallery

References

External links
 

 40th Street entrance from Google Maps Street View

SEPTA Market-Frankford Line stations
Railway stations in Philadelphia
Railway stations in the United States opened in 1956
Railway stations located underground in Pennsylvania
SEPTA Subway–Surface Trolley Line stations